William Alonzo Rinehart (April 5, 1846 – January 30, 1922) was an American Democratic politician who served as a member of the Virginia Senate, representing the state's 7th district.

References

External links
 
 

1846 births
1922 deaths
Democratic Party members of the Virginia House of Delegates
Democratic Party Virginia state senators
People from Fincastle, Virginia
People of Virginia in the American Civil War